Steven N'Guessan (born 29 July 2000) is a French professional footballer, who plays as a defender for Gazélec Ajaccio in Ligue 2.

Club career
N'Guessan made his professional debut for Gazélec Ajaccio in a 4-1 Ligue 2 loss to FC Sochaux-Montbéliard on 2 February 2018, wherein he assisted his side's only goal.

References

External links
 
 
 

Living people
2000 births
French footballers
French sportspeople of Ivorian descent
Gazélec Ajaccio players
Ligue 2 players
Association football defenders